Y'all Come Back Saloon is a 1977 album by American vocal quartet The Oak Ridge Boys, and the group's first country music album.

Four singles were released from the album: the title song, "You're the One", "I'll Be True to You" and "Easy". The first three singles all sold well, and "I'll Be True to You" hit number one on the Billboard Hot Country Songs chart.

The song "Old Time Lovin'" from this album was played on the TV series The Dukes of Hazzard, in the season 2 episode "Granny Annie".

Track listing

Personnel
The Oak Ridge Boys
Duane Allen - lead vocals
Joe Bonsall - tenor vocals
William Lee Golden - baritone vocals
Richard Sterban - bass vocals
Additional musicians
Jimmy Capps, Victor Jordan, Jerry Shook, Bobby Thompson, Chip Young - acoustic guitar
Victor Jordan, Bobby Thompson - banjo
Joe Osborn, Henry Strzelecki - bass guitar
Hayward Bishop, Jerry Carrigan - drums
Billy Sanford, Pete Wade, Reggie Young - electric guitar
Johnny Gimble - fiddle
David Briggs, Ron Oates - piano
Lloyd Green - steel guitar
Marvin Chantry, Roy Christensen, Virginia Christensen, Carl Gorodetzky, Lennie Haight, Sheldon Kurland, Steven Smith, Donald Teal, Gary Vanosdale, Stephanie Woolf - strings
Bergen White - string arrangements

References

The Oak Ridge Boys albums
1977 albums
Dot Records albums
Albums produced by Ron Chancey